Fight for Us is a 1989 Philippine political thriller film directed by Lino Brocka and written by Jose F. Lacaba. It stars Phillip Salvador and Dina Bonnevie. During its initial release, the film was banned in the Philippines by President Corazon Aquino due to its subversive message (Brocka was a member of a progressive organization representing artists). It was shown to the Filipino public after its premiere out of competition at the 1989 Cannes Film Festival.

Plot
In 1985, in the obscure town of Santa Filomena, the Orapronobis, a cult under the leadership of Kumander Kontra (Roco), murders a foreign priest who gave the last rites to an alleged rebel, who was also executed by the same group. At the success of the 1986 EDSA revolution, political detainees, led by Jimmy Cordero (Salvador), celebrate the fall of the Marcos dictatorship. All political prisoners are released, including Jimmy, an ex-priest-turned-underground revolutionary. Not long, after, Jimmy marries a human rights activist, Trixie (Bonnevie). Jimmy becomes an advocate of human rights. Despite Trixie's protests, her brother, Roland (Lorenzo), and Jimmy go on a fact-finding mission to Santa Filomena to investigate the latest crime committed by the Orapronobis. Jimmy meets Esper (Alajar), his ex-girlfriend. He finds out that he has a son with her, Camilo (Herrera). They agree to keep Jimmy's true identity a secret from the boy. Conniving with the army, the Orapronobis step up their acts of terror. Jimmy's group helps evacuate the townspeople to the town church, then later to Manila. Back in Manila, Jimmy turns down a friend's invitation to rejoin the underground movement. Later, he and Roland are ambushed. Jimmy survives, but Roland does not. He recovers and shortly after that, Trixie gives birth to their child. Soldiers raid the refugee center with a masked man who identifies several of the barrio folk as rebels. The refugees and the human rights activists complain to the government. Esper and her son are abducted by the Orapronobis who accuse Esper of helping the rebels. She is raped and beaten up by Kumander Kontra in front of Camilo. Fighting back, she shoots at Kontra. In a hysterical rage, Kontra goes on a shooting rampage, killing Esper, Camilo and the captured barrio men. Later, the military bring the casualties to the town where Jimmy weeps over the bodies of Esper and his son. The film ends with Jimmy contacting his old colleague from the underground.

Cast
Phillip Salvador as Jimmy Cordero
Dina Bonnevie as Trixie Cordero
Gina Alajar as Esper
Bembol Roco as Kumander Kontra
Abbo dela Cruz as Django
Pen Medina as Chief Sparrow
Joel Lamangan as Col. Mateo
Gerard Bernschein as Father Jeff
Ernie Zarate as Bishop Romero
Jess Ramos as Capt. Sumilang
Obby Castañeda as Politician 1
Pocholo Montes as Politician 2
Ben Vibar as TV Newscaster 1
Raquel Villavicencio as TV Newscaster 2
Joe Taruc as TV Reporter 1
Dodie Lacuna as TV Reporter 2
Thea Cleofe Salvador as Government Representative
Archie Adamos as Henchman
Fred Capulong as Henchman
Rene Hawkins as Henchman
Esther Chavez as Mrs. Medina
Estrella Kuenzler as Mrs. Cordero
Ruben Rustia as Monsignor
Apo Chua as Jun Lazaro
Tess Dumpit as Malou Lazaro
Raquel Tan as Secretary
Suzette Rigor as Midwife
William Lorenzo as Roland
Mae Quesada as Volunteer
Ramon Hodel as Volunteer
Lito Tiongeon as Volunteer
Mad Nicolas as Volunteer
Nanding Josef as Volunteer
Roger Moring as Orapronobis Death Squad
Boy Roque as Orapronobis Death Squad
Jun Nido as Orapronobis Death Squad
Emil Estrada as Orapronobis Death Squad
Ver De Guzman as Orapronobis Death Squad
Ray Ventura as Refugee
Connie Chua as Refugee
RR Herrera as Camilo
Beth Mondragon as Refugee
Evelyn Vargas as Refugee
Raul Alfonso as Refugee
Ernie Cloma as Refugee
Chie Concepcion as Refugee
Bituin Rada as Refugee
Malou de Guzman as Refugee
Atong Redillas as Refugee
Dante Balaois as Refugee
Jovy Zarrate as Refugee
Suyen Chua as Refugee
Rody Vera as Terrorist
Carol Villena as Terrorist
Mina Nicolas as Terrorist
Elson Montalbo as Terrorist
Arthur Venegas as Terrorist
Benjie Ledesma as Terrorist
Menggie Cobarrubias as Human Rights Lawyer
Ellen Ongkeko as Human Rights Lawyer
Khryss Adalia as Human Rights Lawyer
Rey Malte-Cruz as Human Rights Lawyer
William Tan as Photojournalist
Ramon Acasio as Photojournalist
Jojo de Guzman as Photojournalist
Arman Son as Photojournalist
Peter Carillo as Photojournalist
Vilma Deonio as Photojournalist
Roger Escleto as Photojournalist
Gil Martea as Photojournalist
Mark Moncado as Photojournalist
John Arcilla as Photojournalist
Jenina Limlengco as Photojournalist

See also
 Jaguar
 Bayan Ko: Kapit sa Patalim

References

External links
 

1989 films
1989 thriller films
Cold War films
Films directed by Lino Brocka
Films about totalitarianism
Philippine political thriller films
Films about human rights
Films about fascism
Philippine thriller films